Tim Charles John Caldwell, OBE, BEM (29 October 1913 – 17 June 1994) was an Australian cricketer who played first-class cricket for New South Wales from 1935 to 1937. He served as Chairman of the Australian Cricket Board from 1972 until 1975 and was a senior executive with the Australia and New Zealand Banking Group.

Early life
Caldwell was born in the Brisbane suburb of Clayfield, Queensland, and educated at Brisbane Grammar School and Newington College (1927–1930). He was a right arm fast medium bowler and right-handed batsman for Northern Districts.

Banking career
On leaving school, Caldwell joined the English, Scottish and Australian Bank and at the time of his retirement was National Assistant general manager, and NSW general manager, of the same organisation, but by then known as the ANZ.

War service
During World War II, Caldwell served in the 9th Australian Division of the AIF and as a Lieutenant was awarded the British Empire Medal.

Cricket
Caldwell played for New South Wales in the Sheffield Shield for three years (1935–1937) and was President of the Northern Districts Cricket Club from 1963 until 1968. He was Chairman of the Australian Cricket Board (1972–1975) during a difficult period of modernisation of the game in Australia.

Honours
 British Empire Medal (1943) – For distinguished military service in the Middle East.
 Officer of the Order of the British Empire (1976) – for services to sport.
 Honorary Life Member – New South Wales Cricket Association
 Honorary Life Member – Marylebone Cricket Club

See also
 List of New South Wales representative cricketers

Notes

References

1913 births
1994 deaths
Cricketers from Brisbane
People educated at Newington College
New South Wales cricketers
Australian recipients of the British Empire Medal
Australian Officers of the Order of the British Empire
Australian Army personnel of World War II
Australian cricketers
Australian cricket administrators
Australian Army officers